is a song recorded by Japanese singer Ado, released on June 22, 2022, by Virgin Music. Written and produced by Motoki Ohmori of Mrs. Green Apple, the song served as the second single from the 2022 soundtrack album, Uta's Songs: One Piece Film Red.

Upon its release, "I'm Invincible" peaked at number 3 on the Oricon Combined Singles Chart and number 2 on the Billboard Japan Hot 100. Globally, "I'm Invincible" peaked at number 74 on the Billboard Global 200.

Background 
On June 8, 2022, the cast for the upcoming film, One Piece Film: Red was revealed. Amongst the cast, Ado was revealed as the singing voice actress for the character Uta while Kaori Nazuka reprised her role for Uta's non-singing parts. Shortly after, Ado released "New Genesis", the image song for the film. Shortly after its release, a new single was announced with lyrics and production by Mrs. Green Apple. The music video for the single subsequently was announced for release on June 22.

Commercial performance 
"I'm Invincible" debuted at number 21 on the Billboard Japan Hot 100. On the Billboard Japan Hot Animation chart, the song debuted at number 5. On the Oricon Digital Singles Chart, "I'm Invincible" debuted at number 8.

Following the release of Uta's Songs: One Piece Film Red in August, “I'm Invincible" reached a new peak on both the Billboard Japan and Oricon charts. On the Japan Hot Animation chart, "I'm Invincible" peaked at number 2. On the Oricon chart, "I'm Invincible" peaked at number 2 on the Digital Singles Chart and number 3 on the Combined Singles Chart. Near the end of September, "I'm Invincible" peaked at number 2 on the Billboard Japan Hot 100. The song later received a Platinum streaming certification from the Recording Industry Association of Japan (RIAJ).

Covers 
Mrs. Green Apple covered "I'm Invincible", which was included as a B-side on their single "Soranji".

Personnel 
Credits adapted from Tidal.
 Ado – vocals
 Motoki Ohmori – songwriting, electric guitar, programming
 Mrs. Green Apple – production, recording arrangement
 Junya Kondo – alto saxophone
 Shuhei Ito – cello
 Sonoko Muraoka – cello
 Hideyuki Karakazu – drums
 Natsuhiko Mori – electric bass
 Hiroto Wakai – electric guitar
 Ken Ito – horn arrangement, string arrangement
 Ryoka Fujisawa – piano
 Hideyuki Kurakazu – tambourine, triangle
 Nobuhide Handa – trombone
 Tatsuhiko Yoshizawa – trumpet
 Mei Mishina – viola
 Sumire Segawa – viola
 Anzu Suhara – violin
 Daisuke Yamamoto – violin
 Honoka Sato – violin
 Kon Shirasu – violin
 Sena Oshima – violin
 Shino Miwa – violin
 Tsukasa Nagura – violin
 Yuki Nakajima – violin

Charts

Weekly charts

Year-end charts

Certifications

Release history

References 

2022 singles
2022 songs
Anime songs
Ado (singer) songs
Virgin Records singles
Universal Music Japan singles